The Javan slit-faced bat (Nycteris javanica) is a species of slit-faced bat found on the Kangean Islands of Indonesia, Nusa Penida, Java, and West Timor. The species' population is decreasing.

Javan slit-faced bats have been recorded roosting in caves, coconut plantations, hollow bases of trees, and culverts, and live in small groups. The major threat to the bat is agriculture. It is protected in Gunung Pangrano.

References

Bats of Asia
Nycteridae
Mammals described in 1813
Taxa named by Étienne Geoffroy Saint-Hilaire